The Roman Catholic Diocese of Queenstown is a diocese located in the town of Queenstown in the Ecclesiastical province of Cape Town in South Africa.

History
 1928: Established as Mission “sui iuris” of Queenstown from the Apostolic Vicariate of Cape of Good Hope, Eastern District
 March 29, 1938: Promoted as Apostolic Prefecture of Queenstown
 April 9, 1948: Promoted as Apostolic Vicariate of Queenstown
 January 11, 1951: Promoted as Diocese of Queenstown

Special churches
 The cathedral is Cathedral of Christ the King in Queenstown.

Bishops
 Prefect Apostolic of Queenstown 
 Fr. John Baptist Rosenthal, S.A.C. (1940.02.09 – 1948.04.09 see below)
 Vicar Apostolic of Queenstown 
 Bishop John Baptist Rosenthal, S.A.C. (see above 1948.04.09 – 1951.01.11 see below)
 Bishops of Queenstown
 Bishop John Baptist Rosenthal, S.A.C. (see above 1951.01.11 – 1972.02.03)
 Bishop John Baptist Rosner, S.A.C. (1972.02.03 – 1984.02.03)
 Bishop Herbert Nikolaus Lenhof, S.A.C. (1984.02.03 – 2009.11.16)
 Bishop Dabula Mpako (2011.05.23 – 2019.04.30), appointed Archishop of Pretoria and Bishop of South Africa, Military
 Bishop Paul Siphiwo Vanqa, S.A.C. (2021.03.03 – ...)

Other priest of this diocese who became bishop
Sithembele Anton Sipuka, appointed Bishop of Umtata in 2008

See also
Roman Catholicism in South Africa

Sources
 GCatholic.org
 Catholic Hierarchy

Roman Catholic dioceses in South Africa
Christian organizations established in 1925
Roman Catholic dioceses and prelatures established in the 20th century
Enoch Mgijima Local Municipality
Roman Catholic Ecclesiastical Province of Cape Town